is a Japanese television jidaigeki or period drama that was broadcast in 1987. It is the 28th in the Hissatsu series.

Cast 
 Makoto Fujita as Mondo Nakamura
 Hiroaki Murakami as Masa
 Tomokazu Miura as Kagetarō
 Kazuko Kato as Otama
 Ken Nishida as Yoriki Onizuka
 Toshio Yamauchi as Tanaka sama
 Kin Sugai as Sen Nakamura
 Mari Shiraki as Ritsu Nakamura

References

1987 Japanese television series debuts
1980s drama television series
Jidaigeki television series